105th Regiment Football Club (also known as the 103rd Light Infantry) was an English association football club in the 19th century, whose home ground was the regimental barracks wherever the regiment was stationed.  The club's first match was in 1874 under the Sheffield rules as the regiment was stationed in Sheffield at the time.  After the 1874-75 season the regiment was moved to Aldershot and the club adopted Association football.

It competed in some of the first stagings of the Football Association Challenge Cup, entering the competition between 1875 and 1878.

Seasons

1875–76

1876–77

1877–78

1878–79

References

Defunct football clubs in England
Military football clubs in England
Association football clubs established in the 19th century